Blairsville Armory is a historic National Guard armory located at Blairsville, Indiana County, Pennsylvania.  It was designed by Pittsburgh architects W.G. Wilkins & Co.  It was built in 1909, and is a "T"-shaped, two-story, three-bays wide and nine-bays deep, castle-like building in the Romanesque Revival style. The front section is the flat-roofed administration building, with a gable roofed drill hall behind. It front facade features a central arched entrance with a five-sided, two-story bay window on the right side.

It was added to the National Register of Historic Places in 1989.

References

Armories on the National Register of Historic Places in Pennsylvania
Romanesque Revival architecture in Pennsylvania
Infrastructure completed in 1909
Buildings and structures in Indiana County, Pennsylvania
National Register of Historic Places in Indiana County, Pennsylvania